Opatrini is a tribe of darkling beetles (Tenebrionidae) in the subfamily Tenebrioninae.

In research by Kamiński et al. published in 2021, Opatrini and six other tribes were moved from Tenebrioninae into the newly resurrected subfamily Blaptinae. These tribes contained 281 genera and about 4000 species, about 50% of Tenebrioninae. The new classification was followed by Bouchard et al. the same year.

Eupachypterus is a fossil genus of Opatrini, known from Oise amber found in Ypresian deposits of France dating from more than 50 million years ago. It was already quite similar to some living Opatriini, such as Neopachypterus and Pseudolamus.

See also
 List of Opatrini genera

References

Further reading

External links

 

Polyphaga tribes
Tenebrioninae